The InterPlane Skyboy is a two-seat, side-by-side, high wing, single engine, pusher configuration ultralight aircraft that was manufactured as a completed aircraft by InterPlane Aircraft of Zbraslavice, Czech Republic.

Design and development

The Skyboy was designed in 1992 specifically for the German market as a trainer. It was adapted for the US FAR 103 Ultralight Vehicles category for use as a two-seat trainer under the FAR 103 trainer exemption. It later became available as a US light-sport aircraft. The aircraft is available in Canada as an Advanced Ultralight Aeroplane.

The Skyboy wing is built from aluminum extrusions for the spars and wing ribs and covered with doped aircraft fabric. The wing's leading edge is Mylar covered in fabric, to increase stiffness. The wing is supported by "V" struts and utilizes jury struts. The fuselage is built upon an aluminum main tube that runs from the tail right to the rudder pedals. The wings and horizontal tail surfaces can be folded for trailering or storage. The cabin is constructed from two fibreglass shells, joined together. The rear of the cabin is covered in aircraft fabric. The optional cabin doors open upwards.

Controls are conventional three-axis. The control stick is a centrally mounted "Y" stick, between the two seats that can be used from either seat.

The Skyboy has a distinctive main landing gear, consisting of a trailing idler link, with suspension consisting of a coil spring mounted over a shock absorber. The company describes the main landing gear: "one of the best landing gears in the market (makes bad landings look good)".

The available engines include the  Rotax 582,  Rotax 912,  Rotax 912S and the  Jabiru 2200. The  Rotax 503 was available at the beginning of production, but did not provide adequate performance.

The Skyboy has never been available as a kit aircraft, but only as a factory-complete, ready-to-fly product. Labour wage levels in the Czech Republic have meant that its price has been generally similar to buying unassembled kits for North American buyers. In 2008 the completed Skyboy base model sold for about US$60,000.

Operational history
Aside from its flight training and recreational aircraft roles, the Skyboy has been employed in South Africa for surveillance duties, in Australia for professional aerial photography and in Mexico for tourist sightseeing flights.

Variants
Skyboy UL
To stay below the exemption's  empty weight limit the aircraft was marketed without cabin doors, wheel pants and hydraulic brakes, using mechanical brakes instead and with a  gross weight. The initial engine was the  Rotax 503 and later the  Rotax 582.
Skyboy S
Higher  gross weight version for Europe and Canada, with the  Rotax 582 or larger engines.
Skyboy ZK
 gross weight version, with the  Rotax 582 engine.

Specifications (Skyboy S)

See also

Bibliography

Notes

References

 - Total pages: 432 
 - Total pages: 310

External links

Skyboy
1990s Czech and Czechoslovakian ultralight aircraft
Light-sport aircraft
Single-engined pusher aircraft